Steve Sharp may refer to:
Steve Sharp (rugby league) (born 1957), Australian rugby league footballer
Steve Sharp (soccer), American soccer player
Steven Sharp (born 1962), English cricketer